CEMB may refer to:
 Center for Applied and Molecular Biology
 Council of Ex-Muslims of Britain